A policy is a principle or rule that guides decisions in order to achieve a rational outcome.

Policy may also refer to:

Principle or rule
 Domestic policy
 Economic policy
 Education policy
 Energy policy
 Environmental policy
 Foreign policy
 Health policy
 Human resource policies
 Information policy
 Immigration policy
 Macroeconomic policy
 Military policy
 Monetary policy
 Privacy policy
 Public policy, government action
 Public policy doctrine
 Science policy
 Security policy
 Computer security policy
 Social policy
 Urban planning, urban policy

Music
 Policy (Martha Davis album), 1987 album by Martha Davis
 Policy (Will Butler album), 2015 debut solo album by Arcade Fire member Will Butler

Other uses
 Insurance policy, a contract between the insurer and the insured which determines the claims which the insurer is legally required to pay
 Policy game or policy racket, a form of illegal gambling or illegal lottery

See also
 Guideline (disambiguation)
 Separation of mechanism and policy, a design principle in computer science